Zhong Tai was an all-electric car manufactured by Chinese company New Power in the 2000s. New Power is a subsidiary of Zotye.

The company in 2009 had preliminary plans to market the car in the UK by 2011, with a price between £16,300 and £20,500.  In the event, no source indicates such plans were ever realized.

See also 
 BYD Auto, another Chinese electric car manufacturer.

References

External links
Sunday Times (UK) - China cracks the electric car
Mission Zero - Zhong Tai, the new Chinese electric SUV, will bring "peace and safety for the people"

Production electric cars
Cars of China
Chinese brands